The Bridport Railway was a railway branch line that operated in the county of Dorset in England. It connected Bridport with the main line network at Maiden Newton, and opened on 12 November 1857. It was extended to West Bay in 1884, but the extension was not well used and it closed to passengers in 1930.

The remaining branch closed in 1975.

Origins
During the 1840s a number of railway schemes had been proposed, that would have put Bridport on a main line from London to Exeter. This included the Bridport and Exeter Railway, and schemes to extend the London and South Western Railway to Exeter from Dorchester. As late as 1853 there was a firm proposal to build such a line, but it fell through and the present-day route via Yeovil was adopted instead.

Dismayed at being abandoned from the main line system, businessmen in Bridport observed that the Great Western Railway (GWR) was making plans to extend its partly built line, the Wilts, Somerset and Weymouth Railway (WS&WR) from Castle Cary to Weymouth and they resolved to build a branch line to connect their town to that line. (The incorporating Act of the WS&WR had originally authorised a branch to Bridport).

Accordingly, on 5 May 1855 they obtained the authorising Act of Parliament to build a  branch line to a junction with the GWR at Maiden Newton. It is said to be the last broad gauge line in Dorset.

Opening

The line opened on 12 November 1857, the GWR line having opened throughout earlier that year. There was one intermediate station at Poorstock, renamed Powerstock in 1860. It was constructed in the broad gauge and worked by the GWR.

It had an unusual type of permanent way described by Captain Tyler of the Railway Inspectorate:

It has been laid with MacDonnell's patent permanent way, consisting of bridge rails weighing 51 lbs and longitudinal rolled iron sleepers weighing 60 lbs to the lineal yard, which are secured to each other by screw bolts and nuts. The gauge is preserved by angle iron cross-ties, nine feet apart; and a strip of wood has been inserted between the rails and sleepers to prevent rigidity. This description of permanent way has been already tried on the Bristol & Exeter Railway, and with such success as to induce the Company to lay down an additional portion of it.

In the nineteenth century
The line was leased to the larger company for 21 years from 1 July 1858. Toller station was opened on 31 March 1862, serving the village of Toller Porcorum. (Toller Fratrum was more easily accessed from Maiden Newton station). The branch was converted to standard gauge in June 1874. It was leased for a further 21 years from 1 July 1882.

The line was extended from Bridport station to West Bay, a little over two miles, opened on 31 March 1884.

The route
Running through undulating topography, the route had to negotiate difficult terrain. It ran broadly west from Maiden Newton at first, climbing the valley of the River Hooke. After a summit west of Toller, the line turned south-west to find the valley of the River Asker and descend into Bridport. The short 1874 extension followed the same river to the sea at West Bay.

The route climbed from Maiden Newton to a summit west of Toller, near the 4 mile post, with a steepest gradient of 1 in 85. From there it fell at 1 in 50 for a mile and a half, and falling nearly as steeply—1 in 62 for part of the way—to Bridport. The West Bay extension was comparatively easy.

Toller
Toller station was opened on 31 March 1862; the platform had no shelter originally. There was a single siding, later made double-ended. In the first half of the twentieth century, milk traffic was a dominant activity.

Powerstock
The only intermediate station when the original line opened, Powerstock station had a single platform with "a small goods yard partly quarried out of the hillside". In a west-facing photograph in Oakley, the summit as the line crosses the watershed towards the Asker Valley is very evident.

Bridport

The original Bridport station was a stone-built terminus with two platforms under a train shed. When opened the station provided a focus in the hitherto remote area for distribution of the net and twine products made locally. When the line was extended to West Bay, the alignment of the existing station had to be altered, and one platform line was removed to allow the other to be curved towards the new extension. Between 1887 and 1902 it was known locally as Bradpole Road station to avoid confusion with East Street.

Bridport East Street

The station was built on the 1884 extension to West Bay, at a location a little nearer the town centre. A thatched cottage adjacent was acquired and turned into the limited station accommodation and station master's house. In 1904 the GWR provided a new building with these amenities.

Bridport West Bay
The extension to West Bay opened in 1884 and the GWR hoped that the area would develop into a major holiday resort. The harbour itself had substantially declined in importance over the years, reducing to 10% of its former trade from 1830 to 1880, in part because of the arrival of the railway itself.

The station was initially called Bridport Harbour, but it was soon renamed Bridport West Bay to encourage the hoped-for holiday business.

There was a signal box on the single platform, and some siding accommodation. Goods activity ceased on 3 December 1962 except for a very limited traffic in coal and shingle, which finished on 1 January 1966.

Twentieth century operation
The Great Western Railway acquired the line by Act of Parliament of 26 July 1901.

During the First World War the West Bay extension was closed as an austerity measure, between 31 December 1915 and 7 July 1919. It re-opened at the end of the war but lost its passenger service on 22 September 1930 when the GWR decided that the hoped for resort would never arrive. The goods service continued until 3 December 1962 when it was withdrawn and the tracks lifted south of Bridport station. Then in 1965 the goods service was withdrawn from the entire branch and at about the same time steam traction was withdrawn. The track layout at Maiden Newton was altered so that through running was no longer possible, in April 1968. This left the line as a siding, a simple railway with no signals other than those at the junction, from Maiden Newton. Services in the final years of operation were provided in the main by a single car diesel multiple unit, usually a Class 121.

At Maiden Newton, the branch had a bay platform on the upside; trains entered in a southerly direction. In twentieth century steam days, there was a siding alongside the branch on a rising gradient, and the customary operation was to propel an arrived passenger train into the siding; the locomotive then moved to another siding, and the passenger coaches descended by gravity into the bay platform under the control of the guard.

Passenger train service
The 1895 Bradshaw shows six passenger trains each way on weekdays. The first train is the 08:20 from Bridport Bradpole Road (i.e. the original terminus) to Maiden Newton; all subsequent trains ran throughout from Maiden Newton to West Bay, with a final short working from West Bay to Bridport only. On Saturdays this was extended to Maiden Newton, and returned as a non-stop Maiden Newton to Bridport train at 22:26 connecting out of a late train. The passenger service was capable of being operated by one train set. Most trains made a connection to or from the Yeovil direction at Maiden Newton. There were two return trips on Sundays.

By 1922 Bradshaw shows a more complicated pattern, with nine trains from Maiden Newton (three of them only running to Bridport station, now designated "Bridport for Lyme Regis"). The 13:50 from Maiden Newton had a connection from Paddington at 10:30, by a slip carriage on the Cornish Riviera Express, slipped at Westbury and then running to Weymouth, and making the connection at Maiden Newton. In the up direction, there were five trains from West Bay to Maiden Newton, and three from Bridport. In addition there was one short working from West Bay to Bridport at 16:52. At least two train sets would have been required to operate this service, and it is likely that some of the unbalanced trains were mixed passenger and goods.

In its final years of operation, services were usually provided by a British Rail Class 121 diesel railcar.

Closure

The line was marked for closure in the Beeching Report but the narrow roads of the area and a subsidy from Dorset County Council kept it running. In 1971 the British Railways Board applied to close the line (under the provisions of Section 56 of the Transport Act 1962). Annual losses were stated to be £54,000. Following a public enquiry, the Secretary of State for the Environment gave permission to withdraw the service and the line was duly closed on 5 May 1975. This was one of the last closures directly linked to the Beeching report. With a surge in demand by local people and rail enthusiasts seeking a final trip, a three carriage Class 117 diesel multiple unit train was used instead of the usual single carriage Class 121 during the final days of operation. The Class 117 and Class 121 were used together to make a four carriage train on the final day of operation.

A replacement bus service was operated at first by Pearce's of Cattistock, but the operator changed with local authority contract. The track was lifted during the autumn of 1975 and little trace of it remains in some places.

The line today
After many years as the office of a boatyard the station building at West Bay has had its appearance restored and houses a cafe. There is a short length of track. Ironically this means that the first station on the line to close is the only one left with track. The station building at Powerstock has been a private bungalow since well before the closure of the line and the site of East Street disappeared under Bridport's ring road some years ago. The junction station at Maiden Newton remains open to trains on the Heart of Wessex Line. Part of the railway line can be walked and cycled on, from Maiden Newton Station for about half a mile, and parts of the old line past Toller Porcorum. Sustrans have funding to use the old line as a cycle path from Maiden Newton to Bridport.

Further reading
 
  Tells the history of the Bridport Branch line and in particular the history and people associated with Powerstock Station

References

External links

Great Western Railway constituents
Rail transport in Dorset
7 ft gauge railways
Closed railway lines in South West England
History of Dorset
Railway lines opened in 1857
Railway lines closed in 1975
1857 establishments in England